Pielavesi is a large lake in the Kymijoki main catchment area in Northern Savonia, Finland. It is situated in the municipality of Pielavesi.

References

Kymi basin
Landforms of North Savo
Lakes of Pielavesi